The statue of Trajan is an outdoor twentieth-century bronze sculpture depicting the Roman Emperor Trajan, located in front of a section of the London Wall built by Romans, at Tower Hill in London, United Kingdom.

Description and history
Trajan is shown bareheaded and wearing a tunic, holding a scroll in his left hand while gesturing with his right hand raised. A plaque at its base contains the inscription: 

The statue was installed in 1980 as a bequest from P. B. "Tubby" Clayton, the vicar of All Hallows-by-the-Tower. The Museum of London believes the figure to have been recovered from a scrapyard in Southampton in the 1920s, and notes that its head does not match its body. There is no information presented at the site about the sculptor.

It is a cast of a late 1st century statue found in Minturno, which is on display at the National Archaeological Museum in Naples. The upper part of the head is the result of restoration; other casts are in Rome (at the via dei Fori Imperiali and Museum of Roman Civilization), Ancona and Benevento.

Trajan presided over the second-greatest military expansion in Roman history, after Augustus, leading the empire to attain its maximum territorial extent by the time of his death. He never himself visited Britain.

See also
 List of public art in the City of London

References

External links

 London's Roman walls, BBC

1980 sculptures
Bronze sculptures in the United Kingdom
London Borough of Tower Hamlets
Monuments and memorials in London
Outdoor sculptures in London
Trajan
Statues in London
Statues of heads of government